The Presidential Palace of Vietnam, located in the city of Hanoi, currently is the official residence of the president of Vietnam. Before 1954, it was named the Palace of the Governor-General of Indochina.

History 
                                                                                                              The palace was built between 1900 and 1906 to house the French governor-general of Indochina and was constructed by Auguste Henri Vildieu, the official French architect for French Indochina. Like most French colonial architecture, the palace is pointedly European. The only visual cues that it is located in Vietnam at all are mango trees growing on the grounds.

The yellow palace stands behind wrought iron gates flanked by sentry boxes. It incorporates elements of Italian Renaissance design, including:
aedicules
a formal piano nobile reached by a grand staircase
broken pediments
classical columns
quoins

When Vietnam achieved independence in 1954, Ho Chi Minh was claimed to have refused to live in the grand structure for symbolic reasons, although he still received state guests there; he eventually built a traditional Vietnamese stilt house and carp pond on the grounds. His house and the grounds were made into the Presidential Palace Historical Site in 1975.

The palace hosts government meetings. It is not open to the public, although one may walk around the grounds for a fee.

The Ho Chi Minh Mausoleum is located nearby the palace. On February 27, 2019, Donald Trump officially met for the second time Kim Jong-un in Hanoi's Presidential Palace.

Gallery

See also
 Tonkin Palace in Hoàn Kiếm District built between 1915 and 1916 to house the governor of Tonkin

Notes

Palaces in Vietnam
Official residences in Vietnam
Presidential residences
Government buildings completed in 1906
French colonial architecture in Vietnam
Historical sites in Hanoi
Governmental office in Hanoi
1906 establishments in French Indochina